Same Height Relation is the second album by Hector On Stilts, released in 2005.

Track listing

 Taxi
 Heart in Your Hand
 La Dee Da
 Mom's in Love Again
 Winterland
 Tongue-tied
 Annie
 Rhyme Like Me
 Squares Into Circles
 Same Height Relation
 Soul So Sweet
 Take One, Bobby

2005 albums